Ronney Pettersson (26 April 1940 – 26 September 2022) was a Swedish footballer who played as a goalkeeper.

Career
Pettersson joined Djurgårdens IF from IFK Skövde in 1958 and made his debut in 1962 for Djurgårdens IF in Allsvenskan. He  became champion with the team in 1966. He also made 17 appearances in the Sweden national team and was a part of the squad in the 1970 FIFA World Cup.

Personal life and death
Pettersson died on 26 September 2022, at the age of 82.

Honours
Djurgårdens IF
 Allsvenskan: 1966

References

External links

1940 births
2022 deaths
Swedish footballers
Association football goalkeepers
Sweden international footballers
1970 FIFA World Cup players
Allsvenskan players
Djurgårdens IF Fotboll players